St Mary's Church is on Manchester Road in Nelson, Pendle, Lancashire. It is a redundant Anglican parish church, and is recorded in the National Heritage List for England as a designated Grade II listed building. It was built in 1879 to a design by Waddington and Dunkerley. The west bay and tower were added between 1905 and 1908. The Ecroyd family provided a large amount of the funding with the rest being raised by public subscription. The chapelry district of Saint Mary, Nelson in Little Marsden, a division of the new parish of Little Marsden, was assigned in August 1879.

In 1989 the church was declared redundant due to decline in congregation and attendance. Bought by a private developer who was refused permission to demolish the building, it was left empty for over two decades and was subsequently acquired by the Heritage Trust for the North West. £250,000 structural repairs have been undertaken, funded by the trust and with substantial support from English Heritage, Pendle Borough Council, and the Architectural Heritage Fund. It is currently the base of the Open Door Furniture Recycling organisation.

Its benefice has been united with that of St Paul's Church, Nelson and the former Church of St Bede to create the parish of Nelson Little Marsden. After 1989, the former Church Hall on Maurice Street was converted into a shared space for both Church and secular organisations. Today it is known as the Beacon Centre, with a chapel in an upper room containing the altar moved from the original church.

See also
Listed buildings in Nelson, Lancashire

References

Church of England church buildings in Lancashire
Churches completed in 1879
19th-century Church of England church buildings
Gothic Revival church buildings in England